Fortune is one of the 25 constituencies in the Sham Shui Po District of Hong Kong which was created in 1994.

The constituency loosely covers Fortune Estate in Cheung Sha Wan with the estimated population of 18,472.

Councillors represented

Election results

2010s

2000s

1990s

References

Constituencies of Hong Kong
Constituencies of Sham Shui Po District Council
1994 establishments in Hong Kong
Constituencies established in 1994
Cheung Sha Wan